Mount Reinstein is a 12,586-foot-elevation (3,836 meter) mountain summit located west of the crest of the Sierra Nevada mountain range, in Fresno County, California, United States. This peak is situated on the common boundary shared by Kings Canyon National Park with John Muir Wilderness, and it is the highest point on LeConte Divide. Reinstein ranks as the 260th-highest summit in California. An ascent of the peak is non-technical, and inclusion on the Sierra Peaks Section peakbagging list generates climbing interest in this remote peak.

History
This mountain was named "Reinstein Peak" in 1911 to honor Jacob Bert Reinstein, a charter member of the Sierra Club, prominent San Francisco attorney, and a regent of the University of California from 1897 until his death on April 16, 1911, at age 57. The toponym's present form was officially adopted in 1983 by the United States Board on Geographic Names.

Climate
Mount Reinstein is located in an alpine climate zone. Most weather fronts originate in the Pacific Ocean, and travel east toward the Sierra Nevada mountains. As fronts approach, they are forced upward by the peaks (orographic lift), causing them to drop their moisture in the form of rain or snowfall onto the range. Precipitation runoff from this mountain drains east into Goddard Creek which is a tributary of the Middle Fork Kings River, and west to the North Fork Kings River.

See also
 
 Sequoia-Kings Canyon Wilderness

References

External links
 Weather forecast: Mount Reinstein
 Jacob Reinstein (photo)
 Jacob Reinstein In Memoriam
 Mt. Reinstein (photo): Flickr

Mountains of Fresno County, California
Mountains of Kings Canyon National Park
North American 3000 m summits
Mountains of Northern California
Sierra Nevada (United States)
Mountains of the John Muir Wilderness